Khistevarz (formerly Kistakuz or Qistaquz) is a village and jamoat in north-west Tajikistan. It is located in Ghafurov District in Sughd Region. The jamoat has a total population of 52,758 (2015).

References

Populated places in Sughd Region
Jamoats of Tajikistan